Damaris Berta Egurrola Wienke (born 26 August 1999) is a professional footballer who plays as a midfielder for French Division 1 Féminine club Lyon and the Netherlands national team. At club level, she made her debut with Athletic Bilbao in 2015, moved to Everton in 2020 then signed for Lyon in January 2021.

Born in the United States, she made her senior debut for the Spanish national team in 2019; in 2022, she filed a one-time switch to represent the Netherlands national team instead.

Club career

Early life
Egurrola spent her early childhood in Orlando, Florida, the second of three children born to a Dutch mother and a Spanish-Basque father (Pablo Egurrola Osa, a professional pelotari competing in American Jai Alai leagues); when he retired in 2006, the family relocated to his homeland in eastern Biscay in Spain's Basque Country.

Athletic Bilbao
After playing youth football at clubs in the Gernika area, Egurrola – who also showed a talent for tennis – signed for Athletic Bilbao in 2012, aged 12, meeting the club's selective signing criteria due to her local upbringing. Following three years at affiliated lower-division clubs, including Betiko Neskak in Erandio and the Athletic B-team, she made her senior team debut in December 2015, making six appearances in the 2015–16 Primera División as Athletic finished as champions, and became a regular from then on. Along with teammate and friend Maite Oroz, she decided to leave the club when her contract expired in the summer of 2020. In July 2020, a court case regarding the legality of 'compensation lists' for players in Spanish women's football confirmed that a new employer would not have to pay a fee to Athletic Bilbao.

Everton
After announcing leaving Athletic Bilbao at the end of her contract, Damaris Egurrola drew interest from major European clubs, including Everton, which ultimately signed the midfielder on a two-year deal in early September 2020. Egurrola made her debut in the FA WSL on 3 October, in a 6–0 win over Aston Villa. Egurrola quickly settled as an instrumental player for the team, starting all subsequent games. Teammate Izzy Christiansen described Damaris as an "incredible talent", impressed by the Spaniard's debut with her new team.

Olympique Lyonnais
Only four months after signing for Everton, rumors started to spread about a new potential move for Egurrola. European champions Olympique Lyonnais were reportedly interested in signing the midfielder in the winter transfer window to address their difficulties in the league. Damaris signed for OL on a three-year and a half deal on 20 January 2021, and made her debut in a Coupe de France game against Stade de Reims. Soon after, Damaris made her debut in both Division 1 Féminine and the UEFA Women's Champions League, both ending in wins and clean sheets.

Egurrola established herself as a starter in the start of the 2021–22 season, proving to be an important member of the team.

International career
Through birth and descent, Egurrola was eligible to play for the United States, Spain and the Netherlands. She was involved with Spanish national age-group teams at several levels and with much success, being a member of the under-17 squad that claimed the silver medal at the 2016 UEFA Women's Under-17 Championship and bronze at the 2016 FIFA U-17 Women's World Cup; the under-19 squad which won the 2017 UEFA Women's Under-19 Championship, (using her height to score a header in the final victory over France) – she also helped the 19s to qualify for the 2018 edition which they again won, but had moved to the higher age group by the time of the finals tournament – and the under-20 squad who were runners-up at the 2018 FIFA U-20 Women's World Cup.

Egurrola made her Spain senior debut in May 2019, aged 19, appearing as a substitute for the closing minutes of a 4–0 friendly win over Cameroon in the build-up to the 2019 FIFA Women's World Cup, although she was not selected in the eventual finals squad. In October 2019, she was called up to the inaugural squad for España Promesas (essentially Spain B), along with two clubmates. She has also played for the unofficial Basque Country team.

Two years after her appearance for Spain, in November 2021 the Spain national team coach Jorge Vilda stated that he had tried to call up Egurrola up twice over the past few months, and to talk to her over the phone on multiple occasions; the player's agents refuted this, responding that these call-ups referred to the Promesas (under-23s) rather than the senior team, and that there had been no attempt to reach out to her personally over the past two years. It was also disclosed that Egurrola had elected to play for another national team, at that time not identified (but one of the two teams in the 2019 FIFA Women's World Cup Final).

After filing a one-time switch, Egurrola committed to the Netherlands national team in March 2022. She made her debut on 8 April 2022. It's later revealed that Damaris herself had shown a great hostility against Spain's manager Jorge Vilda over his treatment on female footballers back in 2018, which was believed to be the factor for her decision to represent the Netherlands instead, to the point she burst in tears.

Career statistics

International

Scores and results list Netherlands' goal tally first, score column indicates score after each Egurrola goal.

Honours
Athletic Bilbao
 Primera División: 2015–16

Olympique Lyonnais
 Division 1 Féminine: 2021–22
 UEFA Women's Champions League: 2021–22

References

External links

1999 births
Living people
Citizens of Spain through descent
People from Busturialdea
Footballers from the Basque Country (autonomous community)
Spanish women's footballers
Women's association football midfielders
Athletic Club Femenino players
Everton F.C. (women) players
Olympique Lyonnais Féminin players
Primera División (women) players
Women's Super League players
Spain women's international footballers
Spanish people of Dutch descent
Spanish expatriate women's footballers
Spanish expatriate sportspeople in England
Expatriate women's footballers in England
Spanish expatriate sportspeople in France
Expatriate women's footballers in France
Soccer players from Orlando, Florida
American women's soccer players
American people of Basque descent
American people of Dutch descent
American expatriate women's soccer players
American expatriate sportspeople in England
American expatriate sportspeople in France
Athletic Club Femenino B players
21st-century American women
Netherlands women's international footballers
Dutch expatriate women's footballers
Dutch expatriate sportspeople in France
Dual internationalists (women's football)
UEFA Women's Euro 2022 players
Spain women's youth international footballers